"The Answer Is Yes" is a song written and originally recorded by Rodney Crowell on his 1992 album Life Is Messy. It was also recorded by Canadian country music artist Michelle Wright. Wright released the song in 1997 as the third single from her fifth studio album, For Me It's You. Her version peaked at number 4 on the RPM Country Tracks chart in May 1997.

Chart performance

Year-end charts

References

1992 songs
1997 singles
Rodney Crowell songs
Michelle Wright songs
Arista Nashville singles
Songs written by Rodney Crowell